Patricia Mullins (born 1952) is a children's book illustrator.

Some of Mullins' illustrations are in the collection of the Ian Potter Centre: NGV Australia.

Books

Written and illustrated by Patricia Mullins 
A Crash of Rhinos: Fun With Collective Nouns (2010) 
One Horse Waiting For Me (1997) 
V for Vanishing: An Alphabet of Endangered Animals (1993) 
Dinosaur Encore (1992) 
The Rocking Horse: A History of Moving Toy Horses, (includes a supplement: International Survey of Rocking Horse Manufacture by Marguerite Fawdry) (1992) 
Fabulous Beasts, pub. William Collins (1976)

Illustrated by Patricia Mullins 
Lightning Jack, Glenda Millard (2012)  hbk,   pbk
Jerry, Ursula Dubosarsky (2009)
Phar Lap, the wonder horse, Kerin Jackie (2008) 
Only a Donkey, Celeste Walters (2007) 
Who's Who at The Zoo, Celeste Walters anthology (1996)
The Dream of the Dusky Dolphin, Jonathan Harlen (1995)
Iceflowers, Jutta Goetze (1992)
The Sea Breeze Hotel, Marcia Vaughan (1991) 
The Triantiwantigongalope CJ Dennis (1989)
Shoes From Grandpa, Mem Fox (1989) 
Crocodile Beat, Gail Jorgensen (1988) 
Hattie and the Fox, Mem Fox (1986) 
The Magic Saddle, Christobel Mattingley (1983) 
Duck Boy, Christobel Mattingley (1983)
Rummage, Christobel Mattingley (1981)
All Sort of Poems, ed. Ann Thwaites anthology (1978)
Pelican Point, Sue Couper (1977)
Wheels and Things, Veda-Hamon Moody and others (1976)
Flowers for Samantha, Letitia Parr (1975)
All In Together, Vashti Farrer (1974)
Blinky Bill and Nutsy, Dorothy Wall (1972)
Dolphins are Different, Letitia Parr (1972)
The Happy Bush, Heather Larsen (1972)

Awards 
1982 Children's Book of the Year Award: Junior Book of the Year Rummage
1993 Australian Book Publishers Association: Best Designed, Illustrated Children's Book V For Vanishing
1993 Parents Choice Award USA Hattie and The Fox
1994 Children's Book of the Year Award: Eve Pownall Award for Information Books V For Vanishing
1994 VI Dimensional Illustrators Awards, New York, USA V For Vanishing
1994 Best Produced English Children's Book, Hong Kong Dinosaur Encore
1998 10th Dimensional Illustrators Awards, New York, USA One Horse Waiting For Me
2012 Dromkeen Medal
2014 International Board of Books for Young People IBBY Australia's Honour Book for Illustration Lightning Jack

See also

References

External links 
 Patricia Mullins website
 Victorian Department of Education and Early Childhood Development
 Phar Lap the Wonder Horse Museum Victoria

1952 births
Living people
Australian illustrators
Australian women illustrators
Australian children's book illustrators